Kongawad is a village in Dharwad district of Karnataka, India.

Demographics 
As of the 2011 Census of India there were 354 households in Kongawad and a total population of 1,532 consisting of 789 males and 743 females. There were 168 children ages 0-6.

References

Villages in Dharwad district